The following is a list documenting major earthquakes that have occurred in Kyrgyzstan. The list also include earthquakes with epicenters outside the country, but caused significant impact in Kyrgyzstan.

List

References 

Source

Kyrgyzstan
Earthquakes in Kyrgyzstan
Natural disasters in Kyrgyzstan
Geology of Kyrgyzstan
Earthquakes